Lieutenant General Kuldip Singh Brar, PVSM, AVSM, VrC (born 1934) is a retired Indian Army officer, who was involved in the Indo-Pakistani War of 1971. As a major general, he commanded Operation Blue Star.

Early days
K S Brar was born in 1934 into a Sikh family. His father, Digambhar Singh Brar (1898–1997), served in World War II and retired as a Major General. He studied at the Doon School, an all-boys' boarding school.

Military career

1971 Indo-Pakistan war
Brar joined the Maratha Light Infantry in 1954 as a second lieutenant. During the Indo-Pakistani War of 1971, Brar commanded an infantry battalion, and was in the first batch of troops who entered Dhaka (now the capital of Bangladesh) on the morning of 16 December 1971. He was awarded the Vir Chakra for the battle fought at Jamalpur on the night of 10 December 1971. His battalion was pitted against the 31st Baluch of the Pakistani Army. The Baluch Regiment launched continuous attacks against Brar's battalion. His soldiers had to move across the river Brahmaputra, at a location where no bridges existed. Therefore, they were able to carry only limited weapons on a man-pack basis. Brar moved from company to company in the midst of the battle, motivating his soldiers to continue the fight despite the lack of sufficient weapons.

In the years following the 1971 Indo-Pak war, Brar was involved in anti-insurgency operations in Nagaland and Mizoram states of India.

Operation Blue Star

In 1984, Indira Gandhi, the Prime Minister of India, decided to deploy the army to flush militants along with Jarnail Singh Bhindranwale and his associates out of the Golden Temple at Amritsar complex. Lt. General Srinivas Kumar Sinha, Vice-Chief of the Indian Army, was initially tasked with leading the operation, but refused stating that he would like to present his views to the Prime Minister, Indira Gandhi before proceeding, given his strong opinion that alternative means existed that didn't require a military siege of the Golden Temple. However, he was superseded and the operation was eventually tasked to K S Brar, along with Lt. General Krishnaswamy Sundarji (then chief of western army command) and Lt. General Ranjit Singh Dyal (then chief of staff in the command), who planned this operation codenamed Operation Blue Star.

Immediately before the Operation Blue Star, K.S. Brar was commanding 9 Division based in Meerut, as a major general. His three brigades were based in Meerut, Delhi and Jalandhar, and two of them were made up of Sikhs. He and his wife were all set to fly to Manila on the night of 1 June 1984 for a month-long vacation. However, on 31 May, he got a call asking him to come to Chandimandir Cantonment. He told his wife that he would be back by evening for the night flight to Manila. However, at Chandimandir Cantonment, he was told to take a flight to Amritsar. There was already a division at Amritsar, but it had been relocated to the Indo-Pak border in case Pakistan decided to move in to support the pro-Khalistan militants. When Brar told his seniors about his planned leave, Ranjit Singh Dyal and Krishnaswamy Sundarji conferred with each other, and asked him to cancel his vacation.

Brar's version of the Operation Blue Star events

Before the operation started, General Brar walked around the Golden Temple in civilian clothes, and saw the militants and the barricades. His former superior, retired Major General Shabeg Singh, who led the militants, saw him making rounds, and knew that he was up to something. According to General Brar, the Shiromani Gurdwara Parbandhak Committee (SGPC), which is supposed to have the managerial control of the temple, had lost the control of the situation.

Since the afternoon, the army kept asking the militants to surrender, using the public address system. The militants were asked to send the pilgrims out of the temple premises to safety, before they started fighting the army. However, nothing happened till 7 PM. General Brar then asked the police, if they could send emissaries inside to help get the civilians out, but the police said that anyone sent inside would be killed by the militants. They believed that the militants were keeping the pilgrims inside to stop the army from entering the temple. Finally, around a hundred sick and old people were let out. These people informed the army that the others were not being allowed to come out.

When asked about why the army entered the temple premises just after Guru Arjan Dev's martyrdom day (when the number of devotees is much higher), General Brar said that it was just a coincidence. The operation had to be completed in a short time, before dawn. Otherwise, exaggerated messages of army besieging the temple would have attracted mobs to the temple premises. The army could not have fired upon these civilians. More importantly, Pakistan would have come in the picture, declaring its support for Khalistan.

General Brar talked to his men (many of whom were Sikhs) personally on the morning on 5 June 1984, and told them what they planned to do and why they were doing it. He explained to them that it was not a mission against any religion, but against some militants who had defiled the sacred temple. He told his men that they may opt out of the operation, if they wished to. General Brar later said that none of his men, including Sikhs, walked away. In fact, in the unit commanded by Lieutenant Colonel Mohammad Israr (whose ten guards later led the first unit into the temple premises), the Sikh Officer Second Lieutenant Jasbir Singh Raina, raised his hand, and said that he wished to be the first one to enter the Golden Temple to wipe out the militants who had defiled the holiest Sikh shrine.

On the night of 5 June 1984, General Brar's troops stormed the temple premises. General Brar had six infantry battalions and a detachment of commandos under his command. Four of the six senior commanders of his forces were Sikhs. General Brar repeatedly asked his soldiers not to fire in the direction of the Harmindar Sahib, even if the militants fired from that side. He later stated that there was no damage to Harmindar Sahib, except a couple of bullet holes that could have been the militants' fire or odd stray fire from the soldiers.

To prevent any damage to the Akal Takht, General Brar's soldiers initially tried to lob stun grenades that momentarily stun people without causing any collateral damage. However, Akal Takht was completely sealed, and there was no way to lob the stun grenades inside. When his soldiers tried crawling towards the Akal Takht, several of them were killed by the militants' fire. General Brar later said in an interview that Bhindranwale and his immediate accomplices had shifted to the first floor of the Akal Takht, and this was against the tenets of Sikhism, since no one is allowed to stay above the Guru Granth Sahib.

According to General Brar, tanks with huge halogen lights were brought "to illuminate the Akal Takht, so that the soldiers could see where they were going and to momentarily blind the militants in the glare of the lights".

General Brar's troops were finally successful in removing the militants from the Akal Takht, and both Shabeg Singh and Jarnail Singh Bhindranwale were killed during the operation.

After Operation Blue Star
Promoted to lieutenant general in 1987, General Brar was subsequently appointed GOC-in-C, Eastern Command, in which role he commanded the Army in the regions bordering China, Nepal, Bangladesh, and Myanmar, and was also responsible for the defence of Bhutan. He was also involved in the counter-insurgency operations in North-East India. He retired on 30 September 1992 after 38 years of service. Since his retirement, General Brar had to reside in the heavily guarded cantonment area of Mumbai. There have been attempts on his life, but none have yet succeeded.

On 30 September 2012, while on Oxford Street in London with his wife, he was knifed in the throat by four men outside a hotel. He received minor injuries and was taken to hospital. Later, he was discharged. The attackers' identities were not immediately confirmed.
 On 4 October, Scotland Yard announced that they had arrested three people, not publicly identified at the time, for the attack, and were continuing to look for the fourth. The following day, eight others, a woman and seven men, were also arrested and charged; on 6 October, nine of the 12 individuals charged, including the woman, were released on bail.

On 8 October, two of the men involved, Barjinder Singh Sangha (born 25 March 1979; aged 33) of Wolverhampton, and Mandeep Singh Sandhu (born 30 April 1978; aged 34) of Great Barr, Birmingham, were charged with wounding with intent to do grievous bodily harm on the retired general. Both appeared at Westminster Magistrates' Court later. Mr. Singh Sangha was also charged with common assault on General Brar's wife, Meena. In court, the two men wore identical grey T-shirts, large, flowing beards and navy blue and black turbans. Both were remanded to police custody and scheduled to be present on 7 December at Southwark Crown Court. Barjinder Singh Sangha pleaded guilty to attacking Brar in January 2013.

On 8 February, 38-year-old Harjit Kaur, of Hayes, west London, was also charged for her part in the attack. She was formally accused of wounding with intent to do grievous bodily harm, and was scheduled to later appear at Westminster Magistrates' Court.

Sandhu and 36-year-old Dilbagh Singh pleaded not guilty to the same charge. On 2 April, a Metropolitan Police spokesperson said Sangha, Sandhu, Dilbagh Singh, and Kaur would stand trial around 15 July.

At the trial, which opened at Southwark Crown Court on 15 July, Kaur also denied the charge of wounding with intent to do grievous bodily harm. Crown Prosecutor Annabel Darlow said, "This was no random attack. This was a highly premeditated assault by people who thought about what they were doing and planned it." During the trial, it was disclosed that when the defendants discovered General Brar was holidaying in London without any security, they scoped out his movements over two days. The night of the attack, Kaur tailed Brar and his wife from a casino to a restaurant. After the couple had left the restaurant, she followed them onto the bus returning to their hotel. Kaur then relayed the couple's position to the other attackers, who ambushed them in Old Quebec Street. Sangha attacked the general with a knife while the others attempted to restrain him and his wife.

On 31 July, Sandhu, Dilbagh Singh, and Kaur were convicted of wounding with intent; Sangha had pleaded guilty to the charge earlier. The attackers were originally scheduled to be sentenced on 19 September; however, a pre-sentencing document had not been issued by then. As a result, on 14 October the Southwark Crown Court changed the sentencing date to 10 December.

On 10 December, Sandhu and Dilbagh Singh were sentenced to 14 years imprisonment; Kaur was sentenced to 11 years and Sangha to 10.5 years.

Views on Operation Blue Star

Operation Blue Star was militarily successful, but it is criticized by many for being badly planned. It is considered to be a political disaster and an unprecedented act in modern Indian history, and was followed by events like the assassination of Indira Gandhi, the assassination of A. S. Vaidya (the-then Army Chief), the subsequent 1984 anti-Sikh riots, and the Punjab insurgency.

Although General Brar later described Operation Bluestar as "most traumatic, most painful", he insisted that it was necessary. He compared Operation Blue Star to the 1979 Grand Mosque seizure.

When questioned about why Operation Blue Star was not as efficient as Operation Black Thunder, General Brar said that the situation during the Operation Blue Star was much more difficult due to the involvement of popular figures like Jarnail Singh Bhindranwale and General Shabeg Singh:

General Brar accepted that Operation Blue Star had hurt the sentiments of many Sikhs, including those who opposed the pro-Khalistan militants. However, he insisted that the act was not against any religion, but against "a section of misguided people", who held the country to ransom. He said, "I respect religion, and respect the fact that I am a Sikh."

In the 1990s, General Brar authored a book on his version of Operation Blue Star, titled Operation Bluestar: The True Story. In an interview, he said that after reading his book, a Canadian Sikh who had earlier threatened him with death, realized that "the people who had let the Sikhs down were some Sikhs and the internal politics of the Akalis", and told him that he had "cleaned the temple".  He also offered to pay for translating the book into Punjabi language so that more people could read it. The book's publishers did the translation later, and the book ran into several reprints.

Military awards and decorations

Dates of rank

References

People of the Indo-Pakistani War of 1971
The Doon School alumni
Punjabi people
People from Faridkot, Punjab
Indian generals
Indian Sikhs
1934 births
Living people
Military personnel from Punjab, India
Recipients of the Vir Chakra
Recipients of the Ati Vishisht Seva Medal
Recipients of the Param Vishisht Seva Medal
Commandants of Defence Services Staff College